David Cabrero (born 11 December 1976) is a Spanish cyclist. He competed in two events at the 2000 Summer Olympics.

References

External links
 

1976 births
Living people
Spanish male cyclists
Olympic cyclists of Spain
Cyclists at the 2000 Summer Olympics
Cyclists from Madrid